Biruta or Birutė is a Latvian and Lithuanian feminine given name, which means "snow", derived from the Lithuanian word byrančiu. The associated name day is June 1.

Letovia
People with the name include:

Birutė of Palagna (died 1382), Grand Duchess of Lithuania, worshiped as a female deity
Biruta Baumane (born 1922), Latvian painter
Birutė Ciplijauskaitė (born 1929), Lithuanian literary scholar 
Birutė Dominauskaitė (born 1973), Soviet Lithuanian basketball player
Birutė Galdikas (born 1946), Canadian anthropologist
Biruta Hulanicki, younger sister of Polish fashion designer Barbara Hulanicki, and namesake of fashion store Biba
Rūta Birutė Jokubonienė (1930–2010), Lithuanian textile artist
Birutė Kalėdienė (born 1934, née Zalogaitytė), Lithuanian athlete
Birutė Kavaliauskienė, mother of Lithuanian basketball player Antanas Kavaliauskas
Biruta Khertseva-Khertsberga (born 1944), Soviet slalom canoeist
Birutė Landsbergis, Lithuanian musician, daughter of Vytautas Landsbergis
Biruta Lewaszkiewicz-Petrykowska (born 1927), judge of the Constitutional Tribunal of Poland
Birutė Mikalonienė, Lithuanian translator
Birutė Nedzinskienė (1955–1994), Lithuanian politician
Biruta Ozolina, wife of the Italian ambassador to Thailand, featured in the painting The White and the Black
Birutė Paukštienė, director of the Ignalina Mikas Petrauskas music school
Birute Regine, British business consultant of Harvest Associates, wife of Roger Lewin
Birutė Šakickienė (born 1968) Lithuanian rower
Birutė Neringa Simonaitis, daughter of Erdmonas Simonaitis
Biruta Skujeniece, Latvian actress-poet sister of Marģers Skujenieks
Birutė Užkuraitytė (born 1953), Lithuanian swimmer
Birutė Valionytė (born 1956), Lithuanian politician
Birutė Vėsaitė (born 1951), Lithuanian politician

Characters
Fictional characters with this name include:

 Biruta (dog), a fictional dog created by Lygia Fagundes Telles, from the eponymous short story Biruta.
 Biruta Aze, a fictional character from the 1947 Soviet film Victorious Return
 Biruta Baiba, a fictional character from the 2016 Latvian film The Chronicles of Melanie

References

Latvian feminine given names
Lithuanian feminine given names